

List of Ambassadors

Daniel Biran Bayor 2018 - 
Daniel Saban 2015 - 2018
Bahij Mansour 2013 - 2015
Marco Sermoneta 2010 - 2013
Amos Radian 2007 - 2010
Yoav Bar-On 2003 - 2007
Eliahu Lopez 2000 - 2003
Pinhas Lavie 1995 - 2000
Yoel Gilat 1992 - 1995
Gavriel Levy 1989 - 1992
Shmuel Tevet 1986 - 1989
Mordechai Palzur 1982 - 1986
David Ramin 1979 - 1982
Baruch Gilead 1974 - 1979
Johanan Bein 1972 - 1974
Alexander Dothan 1969 - 1971
Avraham Sarlouis1967 - 1969
Binyamin Varon 1964 - 1967
Mordekhai Shneeron (Non-Resident, Mexico City) 1960 - 1963
Ambassador David Shaltiel (Non-Resident, Mexico City) 1956 - 1959
Minister Yossef Keisari (Non-Resident, Mexico City) 1954 - 1956

References

Dominican
Israel